Meterik  is a village in the Dutch province of Limburg. It is located in the municipality of Horst aan de Maas, bordering rich farmland to the north and a moor called De Peel to the west. Meterik is located along a brook, the Kabroekse beek, which provides fertile grazing lands.

On 1 January 2019, Meterik had 1627 inhabitants. Meterik is the ancestral home of astronomer Peter Jenniskens. The village is known as a haven for temporary workers for seasonal work in the agricultural sector. Currently many of the workers are from Bulgaria and Romania.

History 

Based on stone tools found, hunter gatherers of the mesolithic (10,000-5,300 BC) frequented the heathlands that formed in Northern Limburg after the Weichselian glaciation. Slash and burn farming came to the region at the start of the neolithic around 5500 BC, with Aegean Neolithic Farmers of the Bandkeramic (linear pottery) culture, mostly settling in the loss lands to the south. Around 2900, the Bronze Age and increased mobility from the domestication of the horse and consumption of milk brought farmers of the Corded Ware culture and the proto-Indo European language to the area. Languages evolved from Italo/Celtic (Tumulus culture 1600-1200 BC) to proto Celtic (Urnfield culture 1300-750 BC).

The Iron Age arrived with farmers of the proto Celtic Hallstatt culture (800-450 BC) and Celtic La Tène culture (450-50 BC). In 1983, parts of the grating and the cupola of a pottery oven were found along the St. Maartensweg in Schadijk and dated to about 500 BC. Traces of Iron Age pottery from a nearby settlement were found along the Crommentuynstraat. And the outline of a farm from the late Iron Age (about 200 BC) was discovered in Meterik's Field in 2006.

The region was part of the Roman empire (50 BC - 456 AD), located in the Civitas Tungrorum, with the influx of the Tungri and later Salian Franks Germanic tribes. Roman coins were found that might suggest the name Meterik originated when a Roman soldier was given land here.

After 515 AD, the area was part of Frankish Austrasia, the Carolingian empire and the Holy Roman Empire. A Carolingian settlement was found in the Meterik's Field with the floor plans of 23 large and 21 small buildings and four wells dated to 625-1000 AD. A feudal system of agriculture developed, with farming areas and moving farms in the service of lords. Sod heather and dung was used to fertilize the land, raising the elevation of Meterik's Field by about 1.7 meters over time. Peat from the moor was used as fuel.

Meterik originated from scattered farms surrounding the open field created by these settlements, as have the communities of Schadijk to the north, and Middelijk and Veld-Oostenrijk in the east.

The oldest reference to 'Meterick' for the area dates to 1483. In the Middle Ages (after 1100 AD) the area became part of the County, the later Duchy, of Guelders. Initial power centers were along the river Maas. In 1326, the nearby castle Huys Ter Horst was founded at the confluence of Kabroekse Beek and Groote Molenbeek. The medieval castle evolved into a home for nobility, but rights to the lands moved hands. At one point the northern part of the field near Schadijk was in hands of the Van Mirlaer family (Meerlo, closer to the confluence of the Groote Molenbeek and river Maas), while the southern and eastern parts were in hands of the owners of the Huys Ter Horst castle. In the Middle Ages, Meterik had its own defensive structure, called a "schans", about 0.5 hectares large and consisting of an earthen wall and a flooded ditch with a draw bridge. In 1622, the area is mentioned as the "schansweide". In 1755, a small house was located there, but taken down in 1793 prior to the oldest known modern topographic map of the area being drawn, the Tranchot und v. Mueffling map of 1802–1804. It was probably located in a hidden, vegetated area near the brook at the Donkstraat where long the "Schans" family lived.

Only with political changes after the French conquest in 1794, the abolishment of the noble "heerlijkheden" in 1798, and the later foundation of the United Kingdom of the Netherlands, did the feudal system of moving farms settle into a number of family-owned farms. The names of the families who built those farms are given in the Tranchot map and are still transmitted to later generations in the form of an informal Limburgish name that many locals use, which refers to the name of a farm or place. In the heathlands north an east of the field, increased removal of sod heather created a barren landscape with sand dunes, which were planted by fir trees in the 1850's and 1860's to create the 'Schadijker Bossen'. The invention of artificial fertilizer subsequently led to the agricultural development of the remaining heathlands south of the field.

Meterik became a nucleated village at the end of the 19th century, when local farmers obtained permission to establish a church under the condition that they themselves provided income for the priest. Subsequently, a church was established, a house for the priest, and a windmill was brought to the village to generate income for the priest. A school was already present in 1733 and enlarged in 1911 (now a gymnastics hall), while a farmer's union (LLTB) hall was build in 1919 and monastery "St. Theresia" in 1925.

Church 

The Church of Meterik, the Saint John the Evangelist, was built in 1899 designed by the architect Caspar Roermond Franssen. The first priest arrived in 1904. In 1922 his son Joseph Franssen enlarged the design of the Church, as the early chapel had become too small. After having been damaged during World War 2, the current church was built in 1946.

Parish 
The Polish, who have settled in large numbers in North Limburg and North Brabant, have their own parish since 2006. It is a so-called categorical parish, which is not bound to a region, but to a group of people. The Polish parish has a Polish priest.

External links 
 History of Meterik's Field
 Website Windmill in Meterik
 Website Huys Ter Horst

References 

Populated places in Limburg (Netherlands)
Horst aan de Maas